Governor Henry may refer to:

Brad Henry (born 1963), 26th Governor of Oklahoma
Guy Vernor Henry (1839–1899), Governor of Puerto Rico in 1899
John Henry (Maryland politician) (1750–1798), 8th Governor of Maryland
Patrick Henry (1736–1799), 1st and 6th Governor of Virginia